Ashton Moss Railway Station was a short lived station on the Oldham, Ashton and Guide Bridge Railway (OA&GB) that served the town of Ashton-under-Lyne. 

The station was located on Moss Lane, at the west end of the town. It had two services in each direction, one early morning, the other late evening. Only the early morning services were provided on Sundays.

The station closed in 1862.

The name Ashton Moss is now used by a stop in a different location on the East Manchester Line of the Manchester Metrolink to Ashton-under-Lyne.



References

Notes

Citations

Bibliography

 
 
 

Disused railway stations in Tameside
Former Oldham, Ashton and Guide Bridge Railway stations
Railway stations in Great Britain opened in 1861
Railway stations in Great Britain closed in 1862
1861 establishments in England